Symra was a Norwegian language periodical published between 1905 and 1914.  

Symra; En Aarbog for Norske Paa Begge Sider Af Havet (Symra; an Annual for Norwegians on Both Sides of the Sea) was established to publish the literary works of Norwegian American authors, writers and poets. Johannes B. Wist and Kristian Prestgard, both editors of the Decorah-Posten, served as editors and publishers of Symras first volumes. Symra was printed by Decorah-posten's trykkeri in the Lutheran Publishing House, now a primary building of the Vesterheim Norwegian-American Museum in Decorah, Iowa.

In 1912, the Symra Company was re-organized with Knut Gjerset of Luther College, and P. J. Eikeland of St. Olaf College serving as editors. As well the magazine, the Symra Company published Norwegian language books including: Ameriká og Andre Digte in 1912, and Efterladte Digte in 1914. Both were books of poems written by Agnes Mathilde Wergeland.  

The pages of Symra featured a listing of notable  Norwegian-American authors including: Peer Stromme, Knut Gjerset, Hjalmar Holand, Waldemar Ager, George T. Flom, Peter Laurentius Larsen, Ole Edvart Rølvaag, and Kristofer Janson.

References

External links
Symra En Aarbog for Norske Paa Begge Sider Af Havet by Kristian Prestgard (1905) 
Symra; en aarbog for Norske paa begge sider af havet; (1906)
Symra en aarbog for Norske paa begge sider af havet; (Volume 7-8) (1911)
Symra,: Et Skrift for Norske Paa Begge Sider Afhavet V. 9-10 1913-1914 

Defunct literary magazines published in the United States
Magazines established in 1905
Magazines disestablished in 1914
Norwegian migration to North America
Magazines published in Iowa
Norwegian-language magazines
1905 establishments in Iowa
1914 disestablishments in the United States